Creag Tharsuinn (643 m) is a mountain in the Arrochar Alps of Scotland. It lies in the Cowal peninsula, Argyll and Bute.

Taking the form of a long ridge, the peak rises steeply above the surrounding glens. It is usually climbed from Garvie in Glendaruel. The nearest village is Kilmodan.

References

Argyll and Bute
Marilyns of Scotland
Grahams